The Riemann hypothesis is one of the most important conjectures in mathematics. It is a statement about the zeros of the Riemann zeta function. Various geometrical and arithmetical objects can be described by so-called global L-functions, which are formally similar to the Riemann zeta-function. One can then ask the same question about the zeros of these L-functions, yielding various generalizations of the Riemann hypothesis. Many mathematicians believe these generalizations of the Riemann hypothesis to be true. The only cases of these conjectures which have been proven occur in the algebraic function field case (not the number field case).

Global L-functions can be associated to elliptic curves, number fields (in which case they are called Dedekind zeta-functions), Maass forms, and Dirichlet characters (in which case they are called Dirichlet L-functions). When the Riemann hypothesis is formulated for Dedekind zeta-functions, it is known as the extended Riemann hypothesis (ERH) and when it is formulated for Dirichlet L-functions, it is known as the generalized Riemann hypothesis or generalised Riemann hypothesis (see spelling differences) (GRH). These two statements will be discussed in more detail below. (Many mathematicians use the label generalized Riemann hypothesis to cover the extension of the Riemann hypothesis to all global L-functions, 
not just the special case of Dirichlet L-functions.)

Generalized Riemann hypothesis (GRH) 
The generalized Riemann hypothesis (for Dirichlet L-functions) was probably formulated for the first time by Adolf Piltz in 1884. Like the original Riemann hypothesis, it has far reaching consequences about the distribution of prime numbers.

The formal statement of the hypothesis follows. If such a character is given, we define the corresponding Dirichlet L-function by

for every complex number s such that . By analytic continuation, this function can be extended to a meromorphic function (only when  is primitive) defined on the whole complex plane.

The case  for all n yields the ordinary Riemann hypothesis.

Consequences of GRH 
Dirichlet's theorem states that if a and d are coprime natural numbers, then the arithmetic progression a, ... contains infinitely many prime numbers. Let  denote the number of prime numbers in this progression which are less than or equal to x. If the generalized Riemann hypothesis is true, then for every coprime a and d and for every ,

This is a considerable strengthening of the prime number theorem.

This is often used in proofs, and it has many consequences, for example (assuming GRH):
The Miller–Rabin primality test is guaranteed to run in polynomial time. (A polynomial-time primality test which does not require GRH, the AKS primality test, was published in 2002.)
The Shanks–Tonelli algorithm is guaranteed to run in polynomial time.
The Ivanyos–Karpinski–Saxena deterministic algorithm for factoring polynomials over finite fields with prime constant-smooth degrees is guaranteed to run in polynomial time.

If GRH is true, then for every prime p there exists a primitive root mod p (a generator of the multiplicative group of integers modulo p) that is less than 

Goldbach's weak conjecture also follows from the generalized Riemann hypothesis. The yet to be verified proof of Harald Helfgott of this conjecture verifies the GRH for several thousand small characters up to a certain imaginary part to obtain sufficient bounds that prove the conjecture for all integers above 1029, integers below which have already been verified by calculation.

Extended Riemann hypothesis (ERH) 

Suppose K is a number field (a finite-dimensional field extension of the rationals Q) with ring of integers OK (this ring is the integral closure of the integers Z in K). If a is an ideal of OK, other than the zero ideal, we denote its norm by Na. The Dedekind zeta-function of K is then defined by

for every complex number s with real part > 1. The sum extends over all non-zero ideals a of OK.

The Dedekind zeta-function satisfies a functional equation and can be extended by analytic continuation to the whole complex plane. The resulting function encodes important information about the number field K. The extended Riemann hypothesis asserts that for every number field K and every complex number s with ζK(s) = 0: if the real part of s is between 0 and 1, then it is in fact 1/2.

The ordinary Riemann hypothesis follows from the extended one if one takes the number field to be Q, with ring of integers Z.

The ERH implies an effective version of the Chebotarev density theorem: if L/K is a finite Galois extension with Galois group G, and C a union of conjugacy classes of G, the number of unramified primes of K of norm below x with Frobenius conjugacy class in C is

where the constant implied in the big-O notation is absolute, n is the degree of L over Q, and Δ its discriminant.

See also 
 Artin's conjecture
 Dirichlet L-function
 Selberg class
 Grand Riemann hypothesis

References

Further reading

Zeta and L-functions
Algebraic geometry
Conjectures
Unsolved problems in mathematics
Bernhard Riemann